This is a list of American films released in 2001. A Beautiful Mind won the Academy Award for Best Picture and the Golden Globe Award for Best Motion Picture – Drama. The Lord of the Rings: The Fellowship of the Ring won the BAFTA Award for Best Film. Moulin Rouge! won the Golden Globe Award for Best Motion Picture – Musical or Comedy and the Satellite Award for Best Film – Musical or Comedy. In the Bedroom won the Satellite Award for Best Film – Drama.

Shrek won the Academy Award for Best Animated Feature.

Murder on a Sunday Morning won the Academy Award for Best Documentary (Feature).

The Believer won the Grand Jury Prize: Dramatic. Southern Comfort won the Grand Jury Prize: Documentary.

Freddy Got Fingered won the Golden Raspberry Award for Worst Picture.

See also
 2001 in American television
 2001 in the United States

External links

 
 List of 2001 box office number-one films in the United States

Lists of 2001 films by country or language
Films
2001